Très Honorable may refer to:

The Right Honourable
Mention très honorable, Latin honors in France for doctor's degrees
Très Honorable
Très honorable avec félicitations